Pyotr Kuzmich Anokhin (January 26, 1898 – March 5, 1974) was a Soviet and Russian biologist and physiologist, known for his theory of functional systems and the concept of systemogenesis. He made important contributions to cybernetics and psychophysiology. His pioneering concept on feedback was published in 1935.

Overview 
Anokhin was born in Tsaritsyn, Russian Empire in 1898. He studied neurophysiology and received a doctorate of medicine. He was an academician of Academy of Medical Sciences of the USSR and the Member of the Academy of Sciences of the USSR. He was one of the founders of the Institute of Psychology of the USSR and the laboratory of neuro-physiology of training.

In the 1920s he started his academic career under the guidance of Ivan Pavlov, Nobel Prize Winner in Physiology or Medicine in 1904. He developed the concept of feedback, published in 1935. Furthermore, he "elaborated the theory of functional systems (FS) which tied together subtle neuro-physiological mechanisms and integral activity of an individual. FS theory was considered as the “methodological bridge” between psychology and physiology". In the autumn of 1950, at a famous scientific session devoted to the problems of Pavlov's physiological teachings, new scientific trends were criticized and the theory of functional systems provoked serious rejection. Anokhin was suspended from work at the Institute of Physiology and sent to Ryazan. 

Currently, his work is highly regarded in Russian and international psychophysiology. One of Moscow prospects and a Research Institute in Moscow was named after Anokhin. Several laboratories carry the names associated with his theory (such as the laboratory of functional systems in the Institute of Psychology, Russian Academy of Sciences.

He died in Moscow.

Publications 
The main works of Anokhin, P.K.:
 1935, The problem of the center and periphery in the physiology of nervous activity, Gorky, 9-70.
 1937, The functional system as the basis for the integration of nervous process during embryogenesis. All- Union Conference of Physiologists, Biochemists and Pharmacologists, Tbilisi (p. 148-156)
 1940, The problem of localization from the point of view of systematic notions concerning nervous functions. J.Neoropath.exp.Neorol.,9, 31-44.
 1945, Dreams and Science, Moscow, Moscow Bolshevik, 40 p., (in Russian)
 1949, The reflex and functional system as factor of physiological integration. Fiziol.Zh.(Moscow), 35, 491-503.
 1958, International Inhibition as a Problem of Physiology, Moscow, Medgiz.
 1961, A new conception of the physiological architecture by conditioned reflex. Brain Mechanisms and Learning, Oxford, Blackwell (pp. 189–229)
 1963a, A methodological analysis of key problems in the conditioned reflex, Philosophical Problems of the Physiology of Higher Nervous Activity and of Psychology, Moscow, Academy of Sciences of USSR (p. 156-214)
 1963b, Systemogenesis as a general regulator of brain development, Progress in Brain Research, Vol. 9, The Developing Brain, Amsterdam, Elsevier (pp. 54–86).
 1968, The biology and neuro-physiology of conditioned reflex
 1973, Biology and neurophysiology of the conditioned reflex and its role in adaptive behavior, Elsevier, 592 p.
 1974, Biology and Neurophysiology of the Conditioned Reflex and Its Role in Adaptive Behavior. Oxford: Pergamon,1974
 1975, The essays on physiology of functional systems
 1977, P.K. Anokhin, Kira V. Shuleikina, System organization of alimentary behavior in the newborn and the developing cat, Developmental Psychology, 10(5)385-419(1977)
 1978, Philosophical aspects of the theory of functional systems.
 1998, Cybernetics of functional systems: Selected works, Moscow, Medicine, 400 p., (in Russian)

See also 
 Biological cybernetics
 Systems biology
 Victor Glushkov
 Nikolai Bernstein
 Norbert Wiener
 List of neuroscientists

References

External links 
 Who is who in Russian psychology
 Pyotr Anokhin
 Scholarly articles for Biology and Neurophysiology of the Conditioned Reflex and Its Role 

1898 births
1974 deaths
People from Volgograd
People from Tsaritsynsky Uyezd
Russian neuroscientists
Russian physiologists
Soviet biologists
Soviet physiologists
Cyberneticists
Neuropsychologists
Systems biologists
20th-century biologists
20th-century Russian scientists
Academic staff of Moscow State University
Academicians of the USSR Academy of Medical Sciences
Full Members of the USSR Academy of Sciences
Soviet military personnel of the Russian Civil War
Lenin Prize winners
Recipients of the Order of Lenin
Recipients of the Order of the Red Banner of Labour
Burials at Novodevichy Cemetery